Darryl DeAngelo Terrell (born 1991) is an American artist, curator and activist, known for their photography and videography. They identify as Queer, femme, and African-American, which has informed their art work. Terrell's work explores issues of history, displacement, femme identity, sexuality, and gender, amongst other issues.

Biography 
Darryl DeAngelo Terrell was born in 1991 in Detroit, Michigan, where they were also raised. They attended Wayne State University, where they graduated with a B.F.A. degree in 2015. Followed by study at School of the Art Institute of Chicago, where Terrell received a M.F.A. degree in photography in 2018.

While attended graduate school, they began experimenting with performance art, and explored gender expression; and for this they created an alter-ego, "Dion". The performance work by Dion was foundation to his photograph, I Look Like My Momma (Self-portrait 1980). Their 2017 work, #Project20s, was photographs of 200 black or brown people in their 20s before Terrell turned age 30.

Terrell has been awarded the Kresge Arts Fellowship (2019), Document Detroit Fellowship (2019), and the Luminarts Fellowship in Visual Arts (2018). Terrell's work is included in the permanent art collection at the Art Institute of Chicago.

References 

1991 births
Artists from Detroit
Wayne State University alumni
School of the Art Institute of Chicago alumni
Queer artists
Artists from Chicago
American LGBT photographers
Living people
21st-century American LGBT people